Zinc fingers and homeoboxes protein 3 is a protein that in humans is encoded by the ZHX3 gene.

This gene encodes a member of the zinc fingers and homeoboxes (ZHX) gene family. The encoded Protein contains two C2H2-type zinc fingers and five Homeodomains and forms a Dimer with itself or with Zinc fingers and homeoboxes family member 1. In the Nucleus, the dimerized protein interacts with the A subunit of the ubiquitous transcription factor nuclear factor-Y and may function as a transcriptional repressor.fx

References

Further reading